Fatma Abdulhabib Fereji is a Zanzibar ACT Wazalendo Politician and was the Member of Parliament in the National Assembly of Tanzania.

External links
  Parliament of Tanzania website

Members of the National Assembly (Tanzania)
Living people
Year of birth missing (living people)
Place of birth missing (living people)
Alliance for Change and Transparency politicians